The International Myeloma Foundation (IMF) is an American non-profit organization serving patients with myeloma, a cancer of plasma cells in the bone marrow. The IMF also provides support and information for family members, caregivers of myeloma patients, physicians and nurses. The organization is dedicated to improving the quality of life for all myeloma patients by focusing on four key areas: research, education, support, and advocacy.

Founded in 1990 by Brian Novis, Susie Novis, and Brian G.M. Durie, IMF is a 501(c)(3) resource for both patients and caregivers, offering programs that include educational seminars, a patient hotline, multilingual publications, government advocacy, and a web-based Personal Information Management system for recording care and treatment.

The IMF is based in North Hollywood, California, and, according to its 2018 annual report, has a membership of 525,000 people in 140 countries. Its motto is "Improving lives — Finding the cure".

History 
The IMF was founded in 1990 by Brian Novis, who was diagnosed with multiple myeloma at age 33, his wife Susie Novis, and his physician Brian G.M. Durie.

Brian Novis died of myeloma in 1992, but the IMF's work continues with Susie Novis serving as President and Durie as Chair of the Board of Directors.

Programs 
There are approximately 32,110 new patients diagnosed with myeloma each year in the U.S. The IMF offers a variety of programs to aid with educating all new patients and their caregivers.

In 1993, the IMF became the first organization to offer Patient & Family Seminars, granting patients and their caregivers access to doctors working in the field of myeloma. US-based seminars have been held in Boca Raton, Florida; Seattle, Washington; Boston, Massachusetts; and Los Angeles, California. Internationally based seminars have been held in the Czech Republic, Denmark, Germany, France, Austria, Norway, Slovakia and Italy.

To address the need for similar events in smaller communities, the IMF also hosts Regional Community Workshops and Myeloma Center Workshops. US Regional Community Workshops have been held in North Carolina, Georgia, Texas, Indiana, Arkansas, Kansas and Wisconsin. Internationally based seminars have been held in Germany, Italy and the Czech Republic.

The IMF produces a number of publications, which are regularly updated and offered free of charge both in print and digitally on the IMF website. The IMF library of publications provides information related to myeloma, including innovations in treatment and information on clinical trials. IMF also produces an InfoPack, which is made up of a selection of the IMF’s publications and is designed to provide newly diagnosed patients and their families with an understanding of the disease and care.

The IMF worked with the Association of Cancer Online Resources (ACOR) to create a myeloma mailing list an amyloid mailing list to facilitate information exchange and support. The IMF also hosts a hotline at 800-452-CURE (2873 and offers online help at www.myeloma.org.

Advocacy

The IMF has an advocacy group (the Myeloma ACTION Team) that guides individuals in taking a stand about critical health issues affecting the myeloma community.

Research
The IMF is involved in a variety of research efforts, which include maintaining a myeloma gene and tissue bank project.

The IMF created the Brian D. Novis Research Grant in 1994 as part of its commitment to finding a cure for myeloma. Novis was the co-founder of IMF and in his memory, the organization promotes research of better treatments, management, prevention, and a cure. The grants are made possible through donations from private individuals and are awarded to doctors and researchers in the field of myeloma, as well as related disorders including but not limited to MGUS (monoclonal gammopathy of undetermined significance) and immunoglobulin derived amyloidosis.

A subsidiary is the International Myeloma Working Group (IMWG), a consortium of more than 100 myeloma researchers from around the world who collaborate on a broad range of myeloma projects. Members of the IMWG conduct research to prevent onset of myeloma, improve treatment and find a cure. The working group publishes statements and treatment guidelines in its own name as well as sponsoring publications by its members.

The IMF also has the Black Swan Research Initiative (BSRI) in order to work towards finding a cure for myeloma.

Fundraising 
The organization holds its major fundraising event, the annual Comedy Celebration benefiting the Peter Boyle Memorial fund, in November of each year.

In the United States, IMF is categorized as a 501(c) non-profit organization by the IRS.

References

External links 
 International Myeloma Foundation

Non-profit organizations based in California
Cancer organizations based in the United States
International medical and health organizations
Medical and health organizations based in California
501(c)(3) organizations